Posa may refer to:

Posa, Iran
Poša, Slovakia
Lajos Pósa (mathematician)
Pouze, southwestern France
Ponsa, 13th-century Dominican friar and Bishop of Bosnia

See also
POSA (disambiguation)
Poza (disambiguation)